"Forever" is a song written by Mark Topham and Karl Twigg, and recorded by British singer Tina Cousins. It was released on 28 June 1999 as the third single from her debut album Killing Time. In Australia, it was coupled with "Killin' Time" and became a top-20 hit, achieving gold shipment numbers.

The single was originally announced as reaching number 45 in the UK Singles Chart; however, a technical error at the time meant sales from two major British music stores (Virgin Megastores and Our Price) were not counted, causing a new chart to be compiled. On the corrected chart, the single reached a higher peak of number 38.

Track listings

UK CD1
 "Forever" (radio edit) – 3:59
 "Forever" (W.I.P. Manaña mix) – 6:05
 "Forever" (Klubbheads 'Dutch FF' mix) – 9:07

UK CD2 and Australasian CD single
 "Forever" (radio edit) – 3:59
 "Killin' Time" ('99 radio edit) – 4:05
 "Forever" (W.I.P. Manaña mix) – 6:05
 "Killin' Time" (Sash! radio edit) – 3:30

UK cassette single
 "Forever" (radio edit) – 3:59
 "Forever" (W.I.P. Manaña mix) – 6:05

European CD single
 "Forever" (radio edit) – 3:59
 "Forever" (12-inch) – 6:05

Charts

Weekly charts

Year-end charts

Certifications

References

Tina Cousins songs
1999 singles
1999 songs
Jive Records singles
Songs written by Karl Twigg
Songs written by Mark Topham